María-Paz Martín Esteban (born November 8, 1960, in Acehúche) is a Spanish mycologist. She has been a fellow of the Real Jardín Botánico de Madrid since 1999, and a researcher at the Spanish National Research Council since 2019. She has authored more than 200 scientific articles on the biodiversity of fungi.

References 

1960 births
Living people
Spanish biologists